Sugira, formerly known as Kunwarpur is a village in India. It lies between Kulpahar and Rath on National Highway 76  4 km from Kulpahar towards Jhansi. Sugira was counted as a model village before 1980.

References

Villages in Mahoba district